Klaus Döring (born 5 April 1938 in Hamburg) is a German classical philologist and philosophical historian.

Life and work 
Döring studied Classical philology, philosophy and musicology at the Universities of Kiel, Würzburg, Hamburg and Freiburg from 1957 to 1964. In 1964 he took the first state examination in Greek and Latin. From 1966, he worked at the University of Freiburg, initially in an assistant position. After he received his doctorate in 1970, he became an Academic Assistant. In 1976 he achieved his habilitation in classical philology at Freiburg. From 1978 to 1980 he completed a clerkship at the South Baden higher education authority. In 1980 he was appointed to the academic council of the University of Freiburg.

In 1981, Döring became Professor of Classical Philology (Greek) at the University of Bamberg. In 2003 he retired.

Döring's research focus was ancient Greek philology and its contemporary reception. He focused on the various philosophical schools and movements (Sophism, Socrates, the Socratics, Plato, Cynicism and Stoicism).

Selected publications 
 Die Megariker. Kommentierte Sammlung der Testimonien (The Megarians: Annotated Collection of Testimonia). Amsterdam 1972 (Dissertation, Universität Freiburg 1970)
 Exemplum Socratis. Studien zur Sokratesnachwirkung in der kynisch-stoischen Popularphilosophie der frühen Kaiserzeit und im frühen Christentum (Exemplum Socratis: Studies on the Reception of Socrates in the Cynic-Stoic Popular Philosophy of the Early Imperial Period and in Early Christianity). Wiesbaden 1979 (Habilitationsschrift, Universität Freiburg)
 Der Sokratesschüler Aristipp und die Kyrenaiker (The Socratic Scholar Aristippus and the Cyrenaeans). Stuttgart 1988
 Die Philosophie der Antike. Band 2,1: Sophistik, Sokrates, Sokratik, Mathematik, Medizin (The Philosophy of Antiquity: Volume 2.1: Sophism, Socrates, Socratics, Mathematics, Medicine). Basel 1998
 (Platon), Theages. Übersetzung und Kommentar ((Plato) Theages: Translation and Commentary). Göttingen 2004
 Die Kyniker (The Cynics). Bamberg 2006
 Kleine Schriften zur antiken Philosophie und ihrer Nachwirkung (Short Essays n Ancient Philosophy and its Reception). Stuttgart 2010, 
Co-edited works
 with Wolfgang Kullmann: Studia Platonica. Festschrift für Hermann Gundert zu seinem 65. Geburtstag am 30. April 1974 (Studia Platonica: Festschrift for Hermann Gundert on his 65th Birthday on 30 April 1974). Amsterdam 1974
 with Theodor Ebert: Dialektiker und Stoiker. Zur Logik der Stoa und ihrer Vorläufer (Dialectic and Stocisim: On the Logic of the Stoa and its Predecessors). Stuttgart 1993
 Pseudoplatonica. Akten des Kongresses zu den Pseudoplatonica vom 6.–9. Juli 2003 in Bamberg  (Pseudoplatonica: Acts of the Congress on the Pseudoplatonica on 6–9 July 2003 in Bamberg). Stuttgart 2005

External links 
 
 Personal site at Bamberg University (with image)

German classical philologists
German historians of philosophy
German scholars of ancient Greek philosophy
Academic staff of the University of Freiburg
1938 births
Living people